119 South Second Street, also known as the Jacob Frank Carriage Shop, is a historic home located in Newport Pennsylvania.

History and features 
This building was originally the location of the Jacob Frank Carriage Shop. A two-story home with a hipped roof, resting on a stone foundation, it was designed with a front entrance that was wide enough to allow carriages to pass through. Although the structure has been vastly altered over the years, it still has its decorative eave brackets. Its original clapboards are now clad in aluminum siding. The home has an inset entrance and a paired window on the first story. 

The structure was listed on the National Register of Historic Places in 1998. It is also identified as #103 in the

References 

Geography of Perry County, Pennsylvania
Historic districts on the National Register of Historic Places in Pennsylvania
Second Empire architecture in Pennsylvania
Italianate architecture in Pennsylvania
Working-class culture in Pennsylvania
National Register of Historic Places in Perry County, Pennsylvania